Mount McCue is a peak,  high, standing  northwest of Mount Wade in the Prince Olav Mountains of Antarctica. It was discovered by the United States Antarctic Service, 1939–41, and surveyed by A.P. Crary (1957–58), who named it for James A. McCue, U.S. Navy, a radio mechanic who was in charge of the first Beardmore Camp during the 1957–58 season.

References

Mountains of the Ross Dependency
Dufek Coast